The Battle of Enniscorthy was a land battle fought during the Irish Rebellion of 1798, on 28 May 1798, when an overwhelming force of rebels assailed the town of Enniscorthy, County Wexford, which was defended only by a 300-strong garrison supported by loyalist civilians. On the previous day at nearby Oulart, several thousand rebels led by Fr John Murphy had massacred a detachment of the North Cork militia, amounting to 110 officers and men.

Resistance
The attack on Enniscorthy began at about 1 p.m., when the rebels drove a herd of cattle through the town's Duffry gate, creating disorder, and set the town's buildings on fire. The troops defending the gate withdrew to a stone bridge over the River Slaney. After a determined defence of about three hours, the loyalist forces had expended their ammunition. They were also flanked by rebels wading across the river's low water, but after having driven all the rebels out of town they were ordered to abandon the town and withdraw to Wexford, which they did alongside a terrified multitude of men, women and children fleeing the burning town. In the action, the garrison and yeomanry had killed up to 500 insurgents at a cost of 90 of their own dead.

Aftermath
According to the historian Maxwell, the town's Protestants saw a merciless night attack as almost certain. Throughout the fight, Catholic residents had been supporting the rebels by shooting loyalists from their windows. Of the many fugitives, the weakest were carried on cavalry horses or otherwise abandoned to their fate, including infants and the elderly.

The rebels were brutal and vengeful in occupying their captured town. They were setting up a formidable encampment of 10,000 men on the nearby heights of Vinegar Hill and were able to roster forces to garrison Enniscorthy, whose streets were littered with dead and dying while flames continued to rage. 478 dwelling houses were destroyed in addition to commercial premises.

References and footnotes

Sources
Dickson, Charles. The Wexford Rising in 1798. Its Causes and its Course. 1955.
Gordon, James B. "History of the Rebellion in Ireland in the year 1798, &c." London, 1803.
Gwynn, Stephen (ed.). "Memoirs of Miles Byrne - edited by his Widow", 2 vols. Dublin & London, 1907.

Battles of the Irish Rebellion of 1798
History of County Wexford
Enniscorthy